Rhagastis hayesi is a moth of the  family Sphingidae. It is known from south-east Asia, including Burma, Vietnam and Thailand.

References

Rhagastis
Moths described in 1982